Morocco, currently a monarchy, has known some attempts to establish republican forms of government. Some of those attempts are continuing to this day:

Morisco refugees from Andalusia formed in Salé and Rabat the Republic of Bou Regreg, a base for piracy (1627-1668).
Berber rebels in the Rif Region first established the Rif Republic (1921-1926) under Abd el-Krim against Spanish colonial rule, the state lasted until 1925 when the rebels tried to take the city of Fes, in a failed attempt to expand the republic into French Morocco.
In 1971 army cadets under General Madbouh and Colonel Ababuh attacked king Hassan II in the Shkirat palace. A republic was proclaimed on Radio Rabat, was but suppressed by General Mohamed Oufkir. However, in 1972 Oufkir initiated his own coup d'état; the Air Force tried multiple times to bring down the king's airplane, attacked the Rabat airport and bombed the royal palace in Rabat. The coup ultimately failed.
During the 2011–2012 Moroccan protests, a few protesters chanted republican slogans. They were mainly from the Al Adl Wa Al Ihssane Islamist movement, the Ila al-Amam marxist group and some leftist streams. These slogans weren't repeated by the vast majority of the protesters.

Current republicanism in Morocco

Both inside and outside Morocco there are many active Moroccan anti-monarchy activists and dissidents in exile who openly criticise the monarchy or advocate for the creation of a "Republic of Morocco" and for the removal or toppling of the Moroccan monarchy through a popular revolution.

The Moroccan authorities continue to crack down on any movement or persons who advocate republicanism or question the legitimacy of the monarchy. As a result, many Moroccan republicanists are active outside Morocco, in Europe or North America often with self-imposed exile.

Currently, the Al Adl Wa Al Ihssane Islamist movement, and Ila al-Amam marxist group are the main republicanist movements in Morocco.

References

External links
Flag and history of Rif-republic

 
Political history of Morocco
Morocco